Cichliformes  is an order of fishes. Its members were previously classified under the order Perciformes, but now many authorities consider it to be an independent order within the subseries Ovalentaria.

Families
There are two families within  the Cichliformes; the convict blennies are a small family consisting of a single genus and two species, while the cichlids are one of the largest vertebrate families with over 202 genera and more than 1700 species. It is molecular data which placed the two seemingly dissimilar families in the same taxon.

The families are:

 Pholidichthyidae D.S. Jordan, 1896 (Convict blennies) 
 Cichlidae Bonaparte, 1835  (Cichlids)

References

 
Ovalentaria
Ray-finned fish orders